The eastern ground parrot (Pezoporus wallicus) of Australia is one of only five ground-dwelling parrots in the world, the others being its closest relatives, the western ground parrot (Pezoporus flaviventris), the extremely rare night parrot (Pezoporus occidentalis), the somewhat closely related Antipodes parakeet (Cyanoramphus unicolor), and the unrelated highly endangered kakapo (Strigops habroptilus) from New Zealand.

The colouration of the three Pezoporus species and the kakapo is similar – yellowish green with darker barring, somewhat reminiscent of the head and back of the wild-type budgerigar. This is not an indication of a true relationship, however, but either adaptation to a particular lifestyle or a feature retained from ancestral parrots; probably the latter as barred plumage is found all over the family, from the tiny tiger parrots to female cockatiels.

When disturbed, a ground parrot flies swiftly just above the ground before dropping back into the vegetation. The presence of the bird is often only revealed by its characteristic dusk and dawn call, a clear whistling sequence of notes which rise in pitch before fading. It is silent in flight.

Taxonomy
Traditionally, two subspecies are recognized within the eastern ground parrot, but recent molecular studies show no genetic differentiation between the two east coast individuals and the individuals from Tasmania. Until recently, the western ground parrot was also considered a subspecies (Pezoporus wallicus flaviventris) but is now considered a separate species (Pezoporus flaviventris).

The eastern ground parrot (Pezoporus wallicus wallicus) occurs in fragmented populations near the coast in southern Queensland, New South Wales (NSW) and Victoria and is considered vulnerable on the schedules of the NSW Threatened Species Conservation Act. There are estimated to be 4000 breeding birds.  It has become extinct in South Australia.

The Tasmanian ground parrot (Pezoporus wallicus leachi) is not considered threatened at state level  and is most common in south west Tasmania.

Description

Up to 30 cm long. Plumage grass green, each feather with black and yellow markings; narrow orange-red band to forehead; head, nape, upper back and breast green, each feather with black shaft marking; feathers of abdomen, thighs and under tail-coverts greenish yellow with black barring; under wing-coverts green; primary coverts green; flight-feathers green with pale stripe across them; underside of flight-feathers with pale yellow wing-stripe; upperside of tail-feathers green with yellowish striped markings, underside brownish; outer tail-feathers yellow with brownish-black striping; bill greyish brown to horn-colour; cere greyish pink; narrow periophthalmic ring pale grey; iris whitish yellow; longish feet greyish brown; claws not so curved as other parrots.

Immatures as adults, but with slightly duller plumage; orange-red band to forehead absent; head, nape, upper back and breast green, each feather with distinct black shaft markings; tail shorter; iris brown.

Distribution
Extreme southeast of Queensland to southwest Australia (scattered in small groups); Tasmania and some off-shore islands.

Habitat
Marshy coastal plain without trees, reed beds with low bushes, restricted to button grass areas; species may depend on naturally occurring fires allowing new growth and renewed settlement by the ground parrot.

Status
Only found in certain localities; threatened in parts of its range by cultivation of large coastal areas, but also foxes, cats and fire; alleged to have strong scent and therefore easily disturbed by dogs.

Breeding

Breeding period from September to January; (one record in March); nest consisted of an excavation in soil 15 cm to 18 cm across and 2 cm (0.75 ins) to 5 cm deep; usually well hidden under small bush or tussock hanging over nest to provide a form of hollow; mostly lined with leaves, grass stalks, fern and small twigs; clutch 3 to 4 eggs; incubation probably 21 days; chicks well camouflaged with thick greyish-black down and protected against cold periods; young remain in nest for two weeks approaching parents for food; fed three times daily; leave nest after three weeks at least disturbance; roost after 25 days outside under tussocks; cannot, however, fly at this point; egg measures 28.1 x 22.2 mm.

References

External links
 World Parrot Trust Parrot Encyclopedia - Species Profiles

eastern ground parrot
Birds of New South Wales
Birds of Tasmania
Birds of Victoria (Australia)
Endemic birds of Australia
eastern ground parrot